Gadna may refer to:

Places
Gadna (village), a Hungarian village

Organizations
Gadna (Israel), an Israeli youth military program
Gadna Tel Aviv Yehuda F.C., an Israeli football club